Dyschirius sjoestedti is a species of ground beetle in the subfamily Scaritinae. It was described by G. Muller in 1935.

References

sjoestedti
Beetles described in 1935